Kasungu Airport  is an airport serving Kasungu, a town in the Central Region of the Republic of Malawi.

Facilities 

References

External links
 

Airports in Malawi
Buildings and structures in Central Region, Malawi